The Bear Hotel may refer to:

United Kingdom
Bear Hotel (Oxfordshire), a 13th-century hotel in Woodstock, Oxfordshire, England
Bear's Paw Hotel, Frodsham, a hotel in Frodsham, Cheshire, England

United States
Big Bear Frontier, a hotel and cabin resort in Big Bear Lake, California
Bear Mountain Inn, a hotel on Seven Lakes Drive, Rockland County, New York